Rock Mills is a census-designated place (CDP) in Randolph County, Alabama, United States. At the 2010 census the population was 600, down from 676 in 2000. According to the U.S. Census, from 1890 until the 1920s, Rock Mills was an incorporated community. It was later designated a CDP beginning in 2000.

Geography
Rock Mills is located at  (33.160348, -85.290469).

Climate

Demographics

As of the census of 2000, there were 676 people, 282 households, and 192 families residing in the CDP. The racial makeup of the CDP was 97.63% White, 2.22% Black or African American, 0.15% from other races. 1.63% of the population were Hispanic or Latino of any race.

There were 282 households, out of which 29.8% had children under the age of 18 living with them, 53.9% were married couples living together, 10.6% had a female householder with no husband present, and 31.9% were non-families. 27.7% of all households were made up of individuals, and 14.2% had someone living alone who was 65 years of age or older. The average household size was 2.40 and the average family size was 2.93.

In the CDP, the population was spread out, with 24.7% under the age of 18, 8.6% from 18 to 24, 28.1% from 25 to 44, 23.4% from 45 to 64, and 15.2% who were 65 years of age or older. The median age was 38 years. For every 100 females, there were 87.8 males. For every 100 females age 18 and over, there were 89.2 males.

The median income for a household in the CDP was $40,714, and the median income for a family was $48,393. Males had a median income of $31,944 versus $20,117 for females. The per capita income for the CDP was $13,093. About 12.3% of families and 16.2% of the population were below the poverty line, including 15.4% of those under age 18 and 52.3% of those age 65 or over.

Rock Mills Industry
The photo of Wehadkee Mill is of a yarn and twine mill which until recent times made yarn, twine and employed a steady number of Rock Mills employees for many decades.

Rock Mills Pottery
In town and nearby (communities of Bacon Level, Alabama and old Cedric, Alabama) was also a larger pottery community making esp. urns, churns, jugs for whiskey, molasses, sugar, milk and the water pitchers and washing bowls needed in every home. These potters still widely known today. And potters from this location moved further West to Mississippi and Texas. 
The immigration road to the West (to Mississippi, Arkansas, esp Texas) passed along here and so this pottery industry allowed immigrants to buy needed urns, churns, pots for storage.
Local potters included well known Pittman Brothers, Boggs Family, WD Pound and Jessie Weathers.

References

http://randolphcountyalabamapottery.com/rock-mills/jesse-weathers/

Census-designated places in Randolph County, Alabama
Census-designated places in Alabama